Olaf of York may refer to:

 Olaf Gothfrith's son, i.e. Amlaíb mac Gofrith
 Olaf Sihtric's son, i.e. Amlaíb Cuaran